Roteiro may refer to
Roteiro, Alagoas, a Brazilian municipality
Roteiro (navigation), a Portuguese navigational route map used in the 15th and 16th century
Adidas Roteiro